Brilliant Waltz is a 1949 French musical crime film directed by Jean Boyer and starring Mártha Eggerth, Jan Kiepura and Lucien Baroux. It was shot at the Boulogne Studios in Paris. The film's sets were designed by the art director Lucien Aguettand.

Synopsis
After a series of admirers of the singer Martha Vassary are attacked, the impresario has the idea of recruiting a famous tenor to act as her bodyguard.

Cast
 Mártha Eggerth as Martha Vassary
 Jan Kiepura as Jan Kovalski
 Lucien Baroux as Monsieur DeBosc, impresario
 Roger Tréville as Hubert de Tiffauges
 Arlette Merry as Lolita
 Jean Hébey as Le directeur
 Jacques Mercier as Le garçon d'ascenseur
 Pierre Destailles as Le voyou
 Léon Berton as Paulo
 Joé Davray as Un pochard
 Bob Ingarao as Un pochard
 Jacques Beauvais as Le maître d'hôtel
 Janine Clairville
 Annie Avril

References

Bibliography

External links 
 

1949 films
French musical films
1949 musical films
French crime films
1949 crime films
1940s French-language films
Films directed by Jean Boyer
French black-and-white films
Films scored by Norbert Glanzberg
Films shot at Boulogne Studios
1940s French films